Linnar Viik (born 26 February 1965 in Tallinn) is an Estonian information technology scientist, entrepreneur and IT visionary.

Currently he is a visiting lecturer at University of Tartu, Estonian Academy of Arts and Tallinn University,  Partner and Member of the Board of Mobi Solutions and Chairman of the Supervisory Board of EIT Digital.

As founder and Programme Director at Estonian e-Governance Academy, he has been advising more than 40 governments on their digital strategy, digital capacities and digital transformation roadmaps. He has been member of the Research and Development Council of Estonia 2001-2017, member of e-Estonia Council 1996-2021.

He is also  member of the Supervisory Board of SEI Tallinn and member of the Advisory Board of Lisbon Council.

Linnar has been member of the Board and lecturing at Estonian IT College since 2000 where he was appointed Acting Rector in 2010.  Linnar Viik was founding Member of the European Institute of Innovation and Technology Governing Board, member of Advisory Board of Nordic Investment Bank, Chairman of the Board of the Open Estonia Foundation.

He is a founder and member of the boards of several mobile communications, broadband and software companies, former advisor to the Prime Minister of Estonia on ICT, innovation, R&D and civic society issues.

Earlier occupations include United Nations Development Programme as advisor and Stockholm Environment Institute as Councilor.

Linnar Viik has written over 120 articles and 10 reports, mostly on the topics of Knowledge Based Economy and Implications of Information Society, as well as being instrumental in the rapid development of Estonian computer and network infrastructure, as well as the Estonian Internet Voting and eSignature projects.

References

External links

 
Linnar Viik - Estonia's Mr Internet

1965 births
Living people
Computer scientists
Information theorists
Computer science educators
Estonian scholars
People from Tallinn
Recipients of the Order of the White Star, 5th Class